Dipyaman Ganguly is an Indian physician-scientist immunologist and cell biologist, currently a Principal Scientist and Swarnajayanthi Fellow at the CSIR-Indian Institute of Chemical Biology (IICB). He heads the Dendritic Cell Laboratory of IICB, popularly known as Ganguly Lab, where he hosts several researchers involved in research on regulation of innate Immunity and pathogenesis of inflammatory disorders.

Ganguly graduated in medicine from Medical College and Hospital, Kolkata in 2001 but shifted his focus to biomedical research and joined the Institute of Genomics and Integrative Biology as a clinical associate. In 2003, he joined Indian Institute of Chemical Biology for doctoral research as a research scholar which earned him his first PhD in 2006. Moving to the US, he carried on his research at University of Texas MD Anderson Cancer Center and received another PhD from the University of Texas Health Science Center at Houston. His post-doctoral work was at the Columbia University Medical Center as an SLE Foundation Fellow and on his return to India, he joined IICB where he is a Principal Scientist. He is also a Swarnajayanti Fellow of the Department of Science and Technology, and was formerly a Ramanujan Fellow of the Science and Engineering Research Board of the Department of Science and Technology.

Scientific contribution 
Research interests of Ganguly lab are exploring the role of dendritic cells in autoreactive inflammatory contexts, deciphering molecular regulation of innate immune response and exploring the role of mechanical cues in immune cells. Researchers from Ganguly Lab recently discovered a novel regulatory module involving the Piezo1 mechanosensors in human T cells, driven by mechanical cues.  They also provided the first evidence for involvement of plasmacytoid dendritic cells in obesity and associated metabolic syndrome in humans. Previous work by Dipyaman Ganguly led to discovery of the key initiation events in pathogenesis of the skin autoimmunity in Psoriasis, as well as first identification of dying neutrophils as the major source of nuclear antigens in systemic lupus, which was featured in Nature Reviews Key Advances in Medicine for the year 2012. Ganguly lab has also interest in development of new therapies for autoimmune diseases. Ganguly lab also took interest in performing research on immunology of COVID-19 disease and ran a randomized control trial on convalescent plasma therapy.

Awards 
The Department of Biotechnology of the Government of India awarded him the National Bioscience Award for Career Development, one of the highest Indian science awards, for his contributions to biosciences, in 2017/18. He is also a recipient of the Merck Young Scientist Award, the CDRI Award for Excellence in Drug Research from CSIR-Central Drug Research Institute, Swarnajayanthi Fellowship of the Department of Science and Technology and the NASI-Scopus Young Scientist Award of the Elsevier.

Public outreach 
Ganguly is an enthusiast for public outreach of science in India, an avid stargazer and a public commentator and popular columnist on issues on science and health.

Selected bibliography

See also 

 T helper 17 cell
 Dendritic cell

Notes

References

External links 
 

Indian scientific authors
Year of birth missing (living people)
N-BIOS Prize recipients
Indian cell biologists
Medical College and Hospital, Kolkata alumni
Maulana Abul Kalam Azad University of Technology
University of Texas MD Anderson Cancer Center alumni
Columbia University alumni
Indian immunologists
Living people
Scientists from West Bengal